Digital imaging or digital image acquisition is the creation of a digital representation of the visual characteristics of an object, such as a physical scene or the interior structure of an object. The term is often assumed to imply or include the processing, compression, storage, printing and display of such images. A key advantage of a digital image, versus an analog image such as a film photograph, is the ability to digitally propagate copies of the original subject indefinitely without any loss of image quality.

Digital imaging can be classified by the type of electromagnetic radiation or other waves whose variable attenuation, as they pass through or reflect off objects, conveys the information that constitutes the image. In all classes of digital imaging, the information is converted by image sensors into digital signals that are processed by a computer and made output as a visible-light image. For example, the medium of visible light allows digital photography (including digital videography) with various kinds of digital cameras (including digital video cameras). X-rays allow digital X-ray imaging (digital radiography, fluoroscopy, and CT), and gamma rays allow digital gamma ray imaging (digital scintigraphy, SPECT, and PET). Sound allows ultrasonography (such as  medical ultrasonography) and sonar, and radio waves allow radar. Digital imaging lends itself well to image analysis by software, as well as to image editing (including image manipulation).

History
Before digital imaging, the first photograph ever produced, View from the Window at Le Gras, was in 1826 by Frenchman Joseph Nicéphore Niépce. When Joseph was 28, he was discussing with his brother Claude about the possibility of reproducing images with light. His focus on his new innovations began in 1816. He was in fact more interested in creating an engine for a boat. Joseph and his brother focused on that for quite some time and Claude successfully promoted his innovation moving and advancing him to England. Joseph was able to focus on the photograph and finally in 1826, he was able to produce his first photograph of a view through his window.  This took 8 hours or more of exposure to light.

The first digital image was produced in 1920, by the Bartlane cable picture transmission system. British inventors, Harry G. Bartholomew and Maynard D. McFarlane, developed this method. The process consisted of “a series of negatives on zinc plates that were exposed for varying lengths of time, thus producing varying densities,”. The Bartlane cable picture transmission system generated at both its transmitter and its receiver end a punched data card or tape that was recreated as an image.

In 1957, Russell A. Kirsch produced a device that generated digital data that could be stored in a computer; this used a drum scanner and photomultiplier tube.

Digital imaging was developed in the 1960s and 1970s, largely to avoid the operational weaknesses of film cameras, for scientific and military missions including the KH-11 program. As digital technology became cheaper in later decades, it replaced the old film methods for many purposes.

In the early 1960s, while developing compact, lightweight, portable equipment for the onboard nondestructive testing of naval aircraft, Frederick G. Weighart and James F. McNulty (U.S. radio engineer) at Automation Industries, Inc., then, in El Segundo, California co-invented the first apparatus to generate a digital image in real-time, which image was a fluoroscopic digital radiograph. Square wave signals were detected on the fluorescent screen of a fluoroscope to create the image.

Digital image sensors

The charge-coupled device was invented by Willard S. Boyle and George E. Smith at Bell Labs in 1969. While researching MOS technology, they realized that an electric charge was the analogy of the magnetic bubble and that it could be stored on a tiny MOS capacitor. As it was fairly straightforward to fabricate a series of MOS capacitors in a row, they connected a suitable voltage to them so that the charge could be stepped along from one to the next. The CCD is a semiconductor circuit that was later used in the first digital video cameras for television broadcasting.

Early CCD sensors suffered from shutter lag. This was largely resolved with the invention of the pinned photodiode (PPD). It was invented by Nobukazu Teranishi, Hiromitsu Shiraki and Yasuo Ishihara at NEC in 1980. It was a photodetector structure with low lag, low noise, high quantum efficiency and low dark current. In 1987, the PPD began to be incorporated into most CCD devices, becoming a fixture in consumer electronic video cameras and then digital still cameras. Since then, the PPD has been used in nearly all CCD sensors and then CMOS sensors.

The NMOS active-pixel sensor (APS) was invented by Olympus in Japan during the mid-1980s. This was enabled by advances in MOS semiconductor device fabrication, with MOSFET scaling reaching smaller micron and then sub-micron levels. The NMOS APS was fabricated by Tsutomu Nakamura's team at Olympus in 1985. The CMOS active-pixel sensor (CMOS sensor) was later developed by Eric Fossum's team at the NASA Jet Propulsion Laboratory in 1993. By 2007, sales of CMOS sensors had surpassed CCD sensors.

Digital image compression

An important development in digital image compression technology was the discrete cosine transform (DCT). DCT compression is used in JPEG, which was introduced by the Joint Photographic Experts Group in 1992. JPEG compresses images down to much smaller file sizes, and has become the most widely used image file format on the Internet.

Digital cameras

These different scanning ideas were the basis of the first designs of digital camera. Early cameras took a long time to capture an image and were poorly suited for consumer purposes. It wasn't until the adoption of the CCD (charge-coupled device) that the digital camera really took off. The CCD became part of the imaging systems used in telescopes, the first black-and-white digital cameras in the 1980s. Color was eventually added to the CCD and is a usual feature of cameras today.

Changing environment
Great strides have been made in the field of digital imaging. Negatives and exposure are foreign concepts to many, and the first digital image in 1920 led eventually to cheaper equipment, increasingly powerful yet simple software, and the growth of the Internet.

The constant advancement and production of physical equipment and hardware related to digital imaging has affected the environment surrounding the field. From cameras and webcams to printers and scanners, the hardware is becoming sleeker, thinner, faster, and cheaper. As the cost of equipment decreases, the market for new enthusiasts widens, allowing more consumers to experience the thrill of creating their own images.

Everyday personal laptops, family desktops, and company computers are able to handle photographic software. Our computers are more powerful machines with increasing capacities for running programs of any kind—especially digital imaging software. And that software is quickly becoming both smarter and simpler. Although functions on today's programs reach the level of precise editing and even rendering 3-D images, user interfaces are designed to be friendly to advanced users as well as first-time fans.

The Internet allows editing, viewing, and sharing digital photos and graphics. A quick browse around the web can easily turn up graphic artwork from budding artists, news photos from around the world, corporate images of new products and services, and much more. The Internet has clearly proven itself a catalyst in fostering the growth of digital imaging.

Online photo sharing of images changes the way we understand photography and photographers. Online sites such as Flickr, Shutterfly, and Instagram give billions the capability to share their photography, whether they are amateurs or professionals. Photography has gone from being a luxury medium of communication and sharing to more of a fleeting moment in time. Subjects have also changed. Pictures used to be primarily taken of people and family. Now, we take them of anything. We can document our day and share it with everyone with the touch of our fingers.

In 1826 Niepce was the first to develop a photo which used lights to reproduce images, the advancement of photography has drastically increased over the years. Everyone is now a photographer in their own way, whereas during the early 1800s and 1900s the expense of lasting photos was highly valued and appreciated by consumers and producers. According to the magazine article on five ways digital camera changed us states the following:The impact on professional photographers has been dramatic. Once upon a time a photographer wouldn't dare waste a shot unless they were virtually certain it would work.”The use of  digital imaging( photography) has changed the way we interacted with our environment over the years. Part of the world is experienced differently through  visual imagining of lasting memories, it has become a new form of communication with friends, family and love ones around the world without face to face interactions. Through photography it is easy to see those that you have never seen before and feel their presence without them being around, for example Instagram is a form of social media where anyone is allowed to shoot, edit, and share photos of whatever they want with friends and family. Facebook, snapshot, vine and twitter are  also ways people express themselves with little or no words and are able to capture every moment that is important. Lasting memories that were hard to capture, is now easy because everyone is now able to take pictures and edit it on their phones or laptops. Photography has become a new way to communicate and it is rapidly increasing as time goes by, which has affected the world around us.

A study done by Basey, Maines, Francis, and Melbourne found that drawings used in class have a significant negative effect on lower-order content for student's lab reports, perspectives of labs, excitement, and time efficiency of learning. Documentation style learning has no significant effects on students in these areas. He also found that students were more motivated and excited to learn when using digital imaging.

Field advancements
In the field of education. 
 As digital projectors, screens, and graphics find their way to the classroom, teachers and students alike are benefitting from the increased convenience and communication they provide, although their theft can be a common problem in schools. In addition acquiring a basic digital imaging education is becoming increasingly important for young professionals. Reed, a design production expert from Western Washington University, stressed the importance of using “digital concepts to familiarize students with the exciting and rewarding technologies found in one of the major industries of the 21st century”.
The field of medical imaging
 A branch of digital imaging that seeks to assist in the diagnosis and treatment of diseases, is growing at a rapid rate. A recent study by the American Academy of Pediatrics suggests that proper imaging of children who may have appendicitis may reduce the amount of appendectomies needed. Further advancements include amazingly detailed and accurate imaging of the brain, lungs, tendons, and other parts of the body—images that can be used by health professionals to better serve patients.
 According to Vidar, as more countries take on this new way of capturing an image, it has been found that image digitalization in medicine has been increasingly beneficial for both patient and medical staff. Positive ramifications of going paperless and heading towards digitization includes the overall reduction of cost in medical care, as well as an increased global, real-time, accessibility of these images. (http://www.vidar.com/film/images/stories/PDFs/newsroom/Digital%20Transition%20White%20Paper%20hi-res%20GFIN.pdf)
 There is a program called Digital Imaging in Communications and Medicine (DICOM) that is changing the medical world as we know it. DICOM is not only a system for taking high quality images of the aforementioned internal organs, but also is helpful in processing those images. It is a universal system that incorporates image processing, sharing, and analyzing for the convenience of patient comfort and understanding. This service is all encompassing and is beginning a necessity.

In the field of technology, digital image processing has become more useful than analog image processing when considering the modern technological advancement. 
 Image sharpen & reinstatement –
 Image sharpens & reinstatement is the procedure of images which is capture by the contemporary camera making them an improved picture or manipulating the pictures in the way to get chosen product. This comprises the zooming process, the blurring process, the sharpening process, the gray scale to color translation process, the picture recovery process and the picture identification process.
 Facial Recognition –
 Face recognition is a PC innovation that decides the positions and sizes of human faces in self-assertive digital pictures. It distinguishes facial components and overlooks whatever, for example, structures, trees & bodies.
 Remote detection –
 Remote detecting is little or substantial scale procurement of data of article or occurrence, with the utilization of recording or ongoing detecting apparatus which is not in substantial or close contact with an article. Practically speaking, remote detecting is face-off accumulation using an assortment of gadgets for collecting data on particular article or location.
 Pattern detection –
 The pattern detection is the study or investigation from picture processing. In the pattern detection, image processing is utilized for recognizing elements in the images and after that machine study is utilized to instruct a framework for variation in pattern. The pattern detection is utilized in computer-aided analysis, detection of calligraphy, identification of images, and many more.
 Color processing –
 The color processing comprises processing of colored pictures and diverse color locations which are utilized. This moreover involves study of transmit, store, and encode of the color pictures.

Theoretical application
Although theories are quickly becoming realities in today's technological society, the range of possibilities for digital imaging is wide open. One major application that is still in the works is that of child safety and protection. How can we use digital imaging to better protect our kids? Kodak’s program, Kids Identification Digital Software (KIDS) may answer that question. The beginnings include a digital imaging kit to be used to compile student identification photos, which would be useful during medical emergencies and crimes. More powerful and advanced versions of applications such as these are still developing, with increased features constantly being tested and added.

But parents and schools aren’t the only ones who see benefits in databases such as these. Criminal investigation offices, such as police precincts, state crime labs, and even federal bureaus have realized the importance of digital imaging in analyzing fingerprints and evidence, making arrests, and maintaining safe communities. As the field of digital imaging evolves, so does our ability to protect the public.

Digital imaging can be closely related to the social presence theory especially when referring to the social media aspect of images captured by our phones. There are many different definitions of the social presence theory but two that clearly define what it is would be "the degree to which people are perceived as real" (Gunawardena, 1995), and "the ability to project themselves socially and emotionally as real people" (Garrison, 2000). Digital imaging allows one to manifest their social life through images in order to give the sense of their presence to the virtual world. The presence of those images acts as an extension of oneself to others, giving a digital representation of what it is they are doing and who they are with. Digital imaging in the sense of cameras on phones helps facilitate this effect of presence with friends on social media. Alexander (2012) states, "presence and representation is deeply engraved into our reflections on images...this is, of course, an altered presence...nobody confuses an image with the representation reality. But we allow ourselves to be taken in by that representation, and only that 'representation' is able to show the liveliness of the absentee in a believable way." Therefore, digital imaging allows ourselves to be represented in a way so as to reflect our social presence.

Photography is a medium used to capture specific moments visually. Through photography our culture has been given the chance to send information (such as appearance) with little or no distortion. The Media Richness Theory provides a framework for describing a medium's ability to communicate information without loss or distortion. This theory has provided the chance to understand human behavior in communication technologies.
The article written by Daft and Lengel (1984,1986) states the following: 	

Communication media fall along a continuum of richness. The richness of a medium comprises four aspects: the availability of instant feedback, which allows questions to be asked and answered; the use of multiple cues, such as physical presence, vocal inflection, body gestures, words, numbers and graphic symbols; the use of natural language, which can be used to  convey an understanding of a broad set of concepts and ideas; and the personal focus of the medium (pp. 83).

The more a medium is able to communicate the accurate appearance, social cues and other such characteristics the more rich it becomes. Photography has become a natural part of how we communicate. For example, most phones have the ability to send pictures in text messages. Apps Snapchat and Vine have become increasingly popular for communicating. Sites like Instagram and Facebook have also allowed users to reach a deeper level of richness because of their ability to reproduce information. Sheer, V. C. (January–March 2011). Teenagers’ use of MSN features, discussion topics, and online friendship development: the impact of media richness and communication control. Communication Quarterly, 59(1).

Methods 
A digital photograph may be created directly from a physical scene by a camera or similar device. Alternatively, a digital image may be obtained from another image in an analog medium, such as photographs, photographic film, or printed paper, by an image scanner or similar device. Many technical images—such as those acquired with tomographic equipment, side-scan sonar, or radio telescopes—are actually obtained by complex processing of non-image data. Weather radar maps as seen on television news are a commonplace example. The digitalization of analog real-world data is known as digitizing, and involves sampling (discretization) and quantization. Projectional imaging of digital radiography can be done by X-ray detectors that directly convert the image to digital format. Alternatively, phosphor plate radiography is where the image is first taken on a photostimulable phosphor (PSP) plate which is subsequently scanned by a mechanism called photostimulated luminescence.

Finally, a digital image can also be computed from a geometric model or mathematical formula.  In this case, the name image synthesis is more appropriate, and it is more often known as rendering.

Digital image authentication is an issue for the providers and producers of digital images such as health care organizations, law enforcement agencies, and insurance companies. There are methods emerging in forensic photography to analyze a digital image and determine if it has been altered.

Previously digital imaging depended on chemical and mechanical processes, now all these processes have converted to electronic. A few things need to take place for digital imaging to occur, the light energy converts to electrical energy – think of a grid with millions of little solar cells. Each condition generates a specific electrical charge. Charges for each of these "solar cells" are transported and communicated to the firmware to be interpreted. The firmware is what understands and translates the color and other light qualities. Pixels are what is noticed next, with varying intensities they create and cause different colors, creating a picture or image. Finally, the firmware records the information for a future date and for reproduction.

Advantages 
There are several benefits of digital imaging. First, the process enables easy access of photographs and word documents. Google is at the forefront of this ‘revolution,’ with its mission to digitize the world's books. Such digitization will make the books searchable, thus making participating libraries, such as Stanford University and the University of California Berkeley, accessible worldwide. Digital imaging also benefits the medical world because it “allows the electronic transmission of images to third-party providers, referring dentists, consultants, and insurance carriers via a modem”. The process “is also environmentally friendly since it does not require chemical processing”. Digital imaging is also frequently used to help document and record historical, scientific and personal life events.

Benefits also exist regarding photographs. Digital imaging will reduce the need for physical contact with original images. Furthermore, digital imaging creates the possibility of reconstructing the visual contents of partially damaged photographs, thus eliminating the potential that the original would be modified or destroyed. In addition, photographers will be “freed from being ‘chained’ to the darkroom,” will have more time to shoot and will be able to cover assignments more effectively. Digital imaging ‘means’ that “photographers no longer have to rush their film to the office, so they can stay on location longer while still meeting deadlines”.

Another advantage to digital photography is that it has been expanded to camera phones. We are able to take cameras with us wherever as well as send photos instantly to others.  It is easy for people to us as well as help in the process of self-identification for the younger generation

Criticisms 
Critics of digital imaging cite several negative consequences. An increased “flexibility in getting better quality images to the readers” will tempt editors, photographers and journalists to manipulate photographs. In addition, “staff photographers will no longer be photojournalists, but camera operators... as editors have the power to decide what they want ‘shot’”. Legal constraints, including copyright, pose another concern: will copyright infringement occur as documents are digitized and copying becomes easier?

See also
 Digital image mosaic
 Digital image processing
 Digital photography
 Dynamic imaging
 Image editing
 Image retrieval
 Graphics file format
 Graphic image development
 Society for Imaging Science and Technology, (IS&T)
 Film recorder
 Photoplotter

References

External links 
 Latest Tech in Digital Imaging Speed: 12,000 Pages Per Hour.
 Rochester Institute of Technology. Digital Imaging and Remote Sensing Lab
 Cornell University. Digital imaging tutorial
 Digital Imaging FAQ/Frequently Asked Questions. Digital Imaging FAQ 
 Dartmouth, Hany Farid. Digital Image Forensics 
 Lectures on Image Processing, by Alan Peters. Vanderbilt University. Updated 7 January 2016.
 http://electronics.howstuffworks.com/cameras-photography/digital/digital-camera.htm

 
Digital photography